Padaung is a river village in Homalin Township in Hkamti District in the Sagaing Region of northwestern Myanmar. It is located on the bank of the Chindwin River next to Maungkan.

References

External links
Maplandia World Gazetteer

Populated places in Hkamti District
Homalin Township